Primulina drakei is a plant in the family Gesneriaceae, native to Vietnam. The species was formerly placed in the genus Chirita.

Description
The inflorescences bear two or three violet flowers.

Distribution and habitat
Primulina drakei is endemic to Vietnam, where it is confined to the islands of Hạ Long Bay, a UNESCO World Heritage Site. Its habitat is on rocks, cliffs and scree from sea level to  altitude.

References

drakei
Endemic flora of Vietnam
Plants described in 1960